Souleymane Cissé (born 30 July 1991) is a Senegalese professional footballer who plays as a midfielder.

Club career
Cissé began playing football with Pikine, and was a part of their senior squad from 2008 to 2014. In 2014, he moved to Sudan with  Al-Hilal Club, and in 2017 to El Hilal El Obeid. After leaving Sudan due to civil unrest, he briefly returned to Pikine before signing with the reserves of Grenoble in late 2019. He joined the senior team in 2020. He made his professional debut with Grenoble in a 1–0 Ligue 2 loss to En Avant Guingamp on 26 September 2020.

23 August 2022, Cissé joined Saudi club Hajer. On 18 January 2023, Cissé was released from his contract.

Personal life
Cissé is the cousin of the Senegalese footballer Moussa Djitté.

References

External links
 
 

1991 births
Living people
People from Sédhiou Region
Senegalese footballers
Association football midfielders
AS Pikine players
Al-Hilal Club (Omdurman) players
El Hilal SC El Obeid players
Grenoble Foot 38 players
Hajer FC players
Senegal Premier League players
Sudan Premier League players
Ligue 2 players
Saudi First Division League players
Senegalese expatriate footballers
Senegalese expatriates in France
Expatriate footballers in France
Senegalese expatriate sportspeople in Sudan
Expatriate footballers in Sudan
Senegalese expatriates in Saudi Arabia
Expatriate footballers in Saudi Arabia